Teaching of Psychology is a peer-reviewed academic journal focusing on psychology. The journal's editor is Andrew N. Christopher. It has been in publication since 1974 and is currently published by SAGE Publications in association with Division 2 of the American Psychological Association.

Abstracting and indexing 
Teaching of Psychology is abstracted and indexed in, among other databases:  SCOPUS, and the Social Sciences Citation Index. According to the Journal Citation Reports, its 2017 impact factor is 0.991, ranking it 86 out of 135 journals in the category ‘Psychology, Multidisciplinary’. and 167 out of 238 journals in the category ‘Education & Educational Research’.

References

External links 
 
 APA official website
 Society for the Teaching of Psychology

SAGE Publishing academic journals
English-language journals